is a traditional Japanese rite of passage and festival day for three- and seven-year-old girls, five-year-old and sometimes three-year-old boys, held annually on November 15 to celebrate the growth and well-being of young children. As it is not a national holiday, it is generally observed on the nearest weekend.

History

 is said to have originated in the Heian period amongst court nobles who would celebrate the passage of their children into middle childhood, but it is also suggested that the idea was originated from the Muromachi period due to high infant mortality. The ages 3, 5 and 7 are consistent with East Asian numerology, which holds that odd numbers are lucky. The practice was set to the fifteenth of the month during the Kamakura period.

Its meaning is to celebrate the survival of children, as infant and child mortality rates were higher in previous centuries.

Over time, this tradition passed to the samurai class who added a number of rituals.

The first of these ceremonies, for three year-olds, is called , meaning "hair-leaving"; traditionally, from the period of seven days after birth until the age of three, a child's head would be kept shaved.

The second of these ceremonies, for five year-old boys, is called .

Symbolizing the transition into womanhood, this practice began in the Kamakura period; originally, it was practiced for 9 year-old girls as well as boys, but in the Edo period transitioned into being performed for girls aged 7 only.

Current practice
 has changed little since the Meiji period. While the ritual regarding hair has been discarded, boys who are aged five and girls who are aged three or seven are still dressed in kimono—many for the first time—for visits to shrines. Three-year-old girls usually wear  (a type of padded vest) with their kimono. Western-style formal wear is also worn by some children. A more modern practice is photography, and this day is well known as a day to take pictures of children. In this case, girls celebrate in the year in which they would reach an age according to the modern calculation of two or six, and boys in the year in which they would reach an age according to the modern calculation of four.

It is given with a bag decorated with a crane and a turtle, which represent long life in Japan.  is wrapped in a thin, clear, and edible rice paper film that resembles plastic.

In popular culture
 In Crayon Shin-chan episode 26–3, "My Shichi-Go-San", the Nohara family celebrates .
 In Mama Loves the Poyopoyo-Saurus episode 11–2, "Shobo-san who came in slobbing mama double", the Poyota family celebrates .
 In Paranoia Agent episode 8, "Happy Family Planning", the character Fuyubachi falls asleep on the train holding , which he later gives to the young girl Kamome-kun.
 In  episode 3, "To Celebrate This Child's 7th Birthday", it is said that Kaizo is scared of  because of a childhood memory.
 In episode 38 of the anime Dragonball Z, Kuririn asks Gohan if he is going to keep wearing that "Shichigosan suit".
 In chapter 19 of the manga Honey and Clover, Hagu has coming-of-age photos taken as she turns 20, but Morita edits the photo to make it look like a  photograph, because she looks so young.
 In episode 854-1 of the anime , Maruko's cousins arrive to celebrate .

References

External links
* .Shichi-Go-San | Japan Experience
 Tokyo with Kids website

Festivals in Japan
November observances
Rites of passage
Japanese words and phrases